Ogo may refer to:

Places
 Ogo, Senegal (disambiguation)
Ogo, Diourbel
Ogo, Louga
Ogo (arrondissement), Matam, Matam
 Ogo Mountains, Somaliland, Somalia
 Ōgo, Gunma, Japan; a town in Seta, Gunma
 Ōgo Station, Maebashi, Gunma, Japan; a train station
 Abengourou Airport (IATA airport code OGO), Abengourou, Ivory Coast

People
 Ogo, historical variant spelling of Hugh (given name)
 Oeyo aka Ogō (1573–1626), Japanese widow of the Shogun
 Misael H. Ogo (born 1984), North Mariana Islands politician
 Suzuka Ogo (born 1993), Japanese actress
 Yūya Ogō (born 1996), Japanese baseball player
 Ogo Adegboye (born 1987), Nigerian basketball player

Fictional characters
 Ogo, a character in Robot and Monster
 Ogo, a character from Gogs

Plants
 Ogonori, a form of edible seaweed
 Ogo (Gracilaria parvispora), a red algae
 Ogo, a pitcher plant cultivar; see List of Nepenthes cultivars

Other uses
 Khana language (ISO 639 language code ogo)
 Outdoor Gravity Orb, a form of zorbing
 Ogo (handheld device)
 Orbiting Geophysical Observatory, a series of satellites
 OpenGroupware.org
 Open Government, a government agency of the U.S. state of Washington; see List of Washington state agencies

See also